Tsang Wing Sze (born 23 August 1972) is a Hong Kong freestyle and backstroke swimmer. She competed in three events at the 1988 Summer Olympics.

References

External links
 

1972 births
Living people
Hong Kong female backstroke swimmers
Hong Kong female freestyle swimmers
Olympic swimmers of Hong Kong
Swimmers at the 1988 Summer Olympics
Place of birth missing (living people)